Santa Maria Assunta is the Roman Catholic parish church of Ombriano, a suburb of Crema, region of Lombardy, Italy.

A church at the site is documented from the 11th century, but the present brick structure was built on the same foundations from 1786 to circa 1797. It was dedicated to the Madonna of the Assumption.

Its interior was decorated in 1890 by Angelo Bacchetta. The church acquired a number of altarpieces derived from suppressed churches and religious buildings, including:
Works by Giovanni Battista Lucini
Scenes from Life of Mary by Giovanni Giacomo Barbelli
Miracle of St Anthony of Padua by Tommaso Pombioli
Presentation of Jesus at the Temple by Giambettino Cignaroli
Martyrdom of St John the Evangelist by Palma il Giovane
Madonna and Child attributed to Callisto Piazza
Madonna with Saint Gottardo and Santa Barbara by Vittoriano Urbino
Stations of the Cross by Fra Luigi Cerioli.

References

Churches in the province of Cremona
Roman Catholic churches completed in 1797
18th-century Roman Catholic church buildings in Italy